This list of electronics brands is specialized as the list of brands of companies that provide electronics equipment.

Categories
Electronics equipment includes the following categories (abbreviations used in parentheses):

audio system (AS) (includes home audio)
avionics (AV)
car audio (CA)
car navigation (CN)
copy machine (CM)
computer (CP) (except personal computer (PC))
digital camera (DC)
display device (DD)
digital video camera (DVC)
digital video player (DVP)
digital video recorder (DVR)
fax (FAX)
global positioning system (GPS)
hard disk drive (HDD)
multifunction printer (MFP)
mechatronics (MN)
mobile phone (MP)
list of video game companies (VG/Electronics) 
network device (NW)
personal computer (PC)
portable media player (PMP)
printer (PR)
semiconductor (SC)
video cassette recorder (VHS)
video game (VG)
video game developer (VGD) 
video game publisher (VGP)
indie game developer (IGD)
transportation electronics system (TES)
television (TV)
wireless devices (WD)
other electronics equipment (OEE)

Other indications:

company name
 (( ))parent company name
 < >previous company name
 << >>company name in local language

Asia

Bangladesh

BMTF
Doel
Jamuna
Rangs
Walton

China

Aigo (Beijing Huaqi Information Digital Technology Co. Ltd.)
Amoi
BYD Electronic
Changhong
Gionee
Haier
Hasee
Hisense
Huawei
Konka Group
Meizu
Ningbo Bird
Oppo
Panda
Skyworth
TCL
TP-Link/intex
Vivo Electronics
Zopo Mobile
ZTE
Xiaomi
OnePlus

Hong Kong

Lenovo

India 

Amkette
Beetel
Bharat Electronics
BPL
Celkon 
Electronics Corporation of India
Godrej
HCL
Havells
IBALL
Intex
Karbonn
Micromax
Myzornis
Moser Baer
Notion Ink
Onida
Surya Roshni Limited
Simmtronics
Sterlite Technologies
Voltas
Videocon
Videotex
Wipro

Indonesia

Axioo
Maspion
Nexian

Iran

 Maadiran Group
 Snowa

Japan

Allied TelesisNW, OEE
AlpineCA, CN
Atari
Brother IndustriesCM, CP, FAX, MFP, PR, OEE
Buffalo (Melco)HDD, NW, OEE
CanonCM, DC, DVC, FAX, MFP, PR, OEE
CasioDC, MP, OEE
ClarionCA, CN
Eclipse (Fujitsu Ten) ((Fujitsu))CA, CN, OEE
Eizo (Eizo Nanao Co.)DD
EpsonCM, FAX, MFP, PR, OEE
Fuji ElectricMN, TES, OEE
Fuji XeroxCM, MFP, OEE
FujifilmDC
FujitsuCA, CN, CP, MP, NW, PC, SC, OEE
FunaiDVP, DVR, TV, OEE
HitachiCP, HDD, SC, TV, TES
IiyamaDD
JVC (Victor Company of Japan, Ltd) ((JVC Kenwood Holdings))AS, CA, CN, DVC, DVP, DVR
Kenwood ((JVC Kenwood Holdings))AS, CA, CN, WD
Konica MinoltaMFP, OEE
KyoceraSC, OEE
Marantz ((D&M Holdings))AS, WD, OEE
Mitsubishi (Mitsubishi Electric) ((Mitsubishi Group))DD, DVP, DPR, TES, OEE
NECCP, MP, NW, PC, SC
NikonDC, DVC
NintendoVG
OkiCP, TES
OlympusDC, DVC
Orion (Orion Electric Co.)DVP, DVR, TV
PanasonicCA, CN, DC, DD, DVC, DVP, DVR, FAX, MP, NW, PC, PMP, SC, TV, WD, OEE
Pentax ((Hoya))DC
PioneerCA, CN, WD, OEE
RenesasSC
RicohDC, CP, MFP
Sansui Electric
Sega Corporation  VG
SharpDD, DVC, DVP, DVR, FAX, MP, PC, SC, TV
SII (Seiko Instruments Inc.)OEE
SNK Corporation  VG
SonyCA, CN, DC, DD, DVC, DVP, DVR, GPS, PC, PMP, SC, TV, VG, WD, OED
TDKSC, OEE
ToshibaCP, DD, DVC, DVP, DVR, PC, SC, TES, TV, OED
Victor (Victor Company of Japan, Ltd) ((JVC Kenwood Holdings))Same as JVC
Yaesu (Vertex Standard)same as Vertex Standard

Currently, not providing electronics products
Akai (repair service)
Denon ((D&M Holdings)) (repair service)

Defunct
Aiwa (acquired by Sony)
Sanyo (merged into Panasonic)
National (merged into Panasonic)

Korea, South

Cowon
Daewoo Electronics
Hansol
Iriver
LG
Pantech
Samsung
Kyocera
Hyundai

Malaysia

Pensonic

Philippines

Cherry Mobile
Fukuda Inc.
Starmobile

Pakistan

PEL
Pakistan Aeronautical Complex
QMobile
Dawlance
Wi-Tribe

Singapore

Creative

Taiwan

Acer
AOC (AOC International) ((TPV Technology Limited))
Aopen
Asus
BenQ
D-Link
ECS
Elsa
EPoX
Foxconn 
Gigabyte
HTC
Lite-On
MediaTek
MSI (Micro-Star International)
Realtek
Silicon Power
Soyo
Surya
Transcend (Transcend Information)
TSMC
VIA Technologies

Thailand

 Samart
 True

Turkey
 Arçelik
 ASELSAN
 Beko
 Canovate
 Geliyoo
 Vestel

Europe

Croatia
KONČAR Group

Finland
Nokia

France

Alcatel-Lucent
Thomson Broadcast

Germany

Blaupunkt
Bosch
Braun (company)
Gigaset
Grundig
Loewe AG
Medion
Metz (company)
Miele
Siemens
Sennheiser
Severin Elektro
TechniSat
Telefunken
Wortmann

Hungary

 Orion (Orion Electronics Ltd)
 Videoton

Italy

Brionvega
Bolva
Brondi
Cinemeccanica
Eurotech (company)
Hidis (owner of Q.Bell and miia brands)
Olivetti S.p.A.
Radio Marconi
Termozeta

Netherlands

Philips
Trust

Norway
Kongsberg Gruppen
Nordic Semiconductor

Russia

Almaz-Antey
Angstrem (company)
General Satellite
MCST
NPO “Digital Television Systems”
Rovercomputers
Sitronics
Sozvezdie
Yota

Slovenia
Gorenje

Sweden
Electrolux
Husqvarna
Paradox Interactive

Switzerland
Revox

Ukraine
EKTA

United Kingdom

Alba
Amstrad
BAE Systems
Binatone
BT
Bush
Cello Electronics
Dyson
EMI
Ferranti
KEF
Marconi
Mitchell & Brown
Morphy Richards
Pace
Pure
Pye
Sinclair Research
Russell Hobbs
Texet
Thorn
Uniross
Vax

North America

Canada

Mexico
Alfa
Kyoto (Kyoto Electronics)
Lanix
Mabe
Meebox
Satmex
Zonda (Zonda Telecom)

United States

3M
Alienware
Amazon
AMD
Analog Devices
Apple
Audiovox
Avaya
Averatec
Bose
Cisco Systems
Crucial Technology
Dell
eMachines
Emerson Electric
Emerson Radio
Fitbit
Gateway
Google
Hewlett-Packard
HP
IBM
Intel
JBL
Kingston
Koss
Magnavox
Micron Technology
Microsoft
Motorola Mobility
Nvidia
Packard Bell
Plantronics
Polycom
Qualcomm
RCA
Sandisk
Seagate
SGI
Sun Microsystems
Texas Instruments
Unisonic Products Corporation
Unisys
Vizio
Viewsonic
Western Digital
Westinghouse Electric Corporation
Xerox
Zenith

Oceania

Australia

A.G. Healing
ADInstruments
Amalgamated Wireless (Australasia)
Blackmagic Design
CEA Technologies
Clarinox Technologies Pty Ltd
Codan
Dog & Bone
Dynalite
Fairlight (company)
PowerLab
Q-MAC Electronics
Radio Rentals
Redarc Electronics
Røde Microphones
Telectronics
Vix Technology
Winradio

South America

Argentina

AeroDreams
Cicaré
CITEFA
FAdeA
INVAP
Nostromo

Brazil

Avibras
Embraer
Gradiente
Itautec
Mectron
Positivo Informatica
WEG Industries

Colombia
Indumil

Venezuela
Siragon
VIT

See also

 Electronics companies by country (category)
 List of best-selling electronic devices
 List of compact disc player manufacturers
 List of microphone manufacturers
 Market share of personal computer vendors

References

Brands
Electronics